General Philipp may refer to:

Christian Philipp (1893–1963), German Wehrmacht lieutenant general
Ernst Philipp (1912–2005), German Wehrmacht major general

See also
Charles III Philip, Elector Palatine (1661–1742), Holy Roman Empire general
Adam Philippe, Comte de Custine (1740–1793), French Army general
General Philipps (disambiguation)